Ballygalget GAA is a Gaelic Athletic Association club located in The Ards Peninsula in County Down, Northern Ireland.  The club is almost exclusively concerned with the game of hurling.

Honours

Down Senior Hurling Championships:
 1959, 1964, 1966, 1970, 1973, 1975, 1982, 1983 1990, 1992, 1997, 1998, 1999, 2003, 2004, 2005, 2008, 2010, 2013, 2016, 2017
Ulster Senior Club Hurling Championships: 3
 1975, 1998, 2005

Noted hurlers

 Gabriel Clarke
 Graham Clarke
 Danny Toner
 Gareth Johnson

References

External links
Ballygalget GAA site

Gaelic games clubs in County Down
Hurling clubs in County Down